The Reunion district of downtown Dallas, Texas (USA) is an area in western downtown anchored by the Hyatt Regency Dallas and Reunion Tower. The name "Reunion" originates from the mid-nineteenth century commune, La Reunion.

The district included Reunion Arena from 1980 to its demolition in 2009. The arena was originally intended to be an economic engine to drive redevelopment of the surrounding district. However, the real estate bust of the 1980s discouraged owner Ray Hunt and his Woodbine Development Corp. from investing beyond the Hyatt and the Tower, and no further building took place.  With the Mavericks and Stars having relocated to American Airlines Center, plans indicated that the land would be put to other uses after demolition of the arena in November 2009, but as of mid-2013, no further use for the former arena site has been found..

Attractions 
Hyatt Regency Dallas
Reunion Tower

Transportation

Highways 
  - Interstate 30
  - Interstate 35E

Trains

Commuter 

Union Station

Light Rail 
DART:  and 
Union Station

Regional 
Amtrak
Union Station

Education 
The district is zoned to schools in the Dallas Independent School District.

Residents of the district are zoned to City Park Elementary School, Billy Earl Dade Middle School, and James Madison High School.

References

External links 
Reunion Arena
Hyatt Regency Dallas